The United States national rugby sevens team season began the 2015–16 World Rugby Sevens Series by "shocking the world" when it defeated New Zealand for the first time at 2015 Dubai Sevens. The United States team beat the 12-time World Series champion in pool play and again in the tournament's third-place match before a third victory in as many matches in the 2015 South Africa Sevens Plate Semifinal. The U.S. once again finished the season in sixth, tying its best ever finish. The previous season's scoring records were broken again, as Perry Baker notched 48 tries and Madison Hughes scored 331 points.

World Rugby Sevens Series

Dubai Sevens
Coming into the tournament, the U.S. had lost 28 consecutive matches to New Zealand. In pool play at the 2015 Dubai Sevens, however, the U.S. notched its first win, despite missing regular forwards Danny Barrett and Andrew Durutalo. The U.S. won 14–12 behind two tries from Perry Baker, and a touchline conversion from Madison Hughes at the end of the match.

Players

World Series

Updated: May 23, 2016

2016 Summer Olympics squad

The table below shows the U.S. roster assembled for the most recent tournament. The statistics (events, points, and tries) refer to statistics generated in World Rugby Sevens Series tournaments.

References

2014–15
United States
2016 in American rugby union
2015 in American rugby union